July 14 - Eastern Orthodox Church calendar - July 16

All fixed commemorations below are celebrated on July 28 by Old Calendar.

For July 15th, Orthodox Churches on the Old Calendar commemorate the Saints listed on July 2.

Saints
 Martyrs Cyricus (Quiricus) and his mother Julitta, of Tarsus (c. 305)
 Martyr Lolianus, kicked to death.
 Martyr Abudimus of the isle of Tenedos (4th century)
 Saint Asiya the Wonderworker, of Tanis in Syria (5th century)
 Holy Equal-to-the-Apostles Great Prince Vladimir the Great (Basil in holy baptism), Enlightener of the Russian Land (1015)

Pre-Schism Western saints
 Saints Eutropius, Zosima and Bonosa, martyrs in Porto near Rome under Aurelian (c. 273)
 Saints Secundinus, Agrippinus, Maximus, Fortunatus and Martialis, martyrs in Pannonia (4th century)
 Saints Catulinus (Cartholinus), Januarius, Florentius, Julia and Justa, martyrs in Carthage in North Africa.
 Saint Apronia (Evronie), the sister of Bishop Aprus of Toul, from whom she received the veil (sixth century)
 Saint Felix of Pavia, a martyr in Pavia in Italy.
 Saint Aeternus (Eternus), ninth Bishop of Evreux in France (c. 660)
 Saint Donald of Ogilvy (c. 716) and his nine virgin daughters, nuns of Abernathy, Scotland.
 Saint Benedict of Angers, Bishop of Angers in the west of France (c. 820)
 Saint Adalard of Corbie, called the younger, he was a monk at Corbie in France (c. 824)
 Saint Haruch, Bishop near Werden in Germany (c. 830)
 Saint Athanasius of Naples, Bishop of Naples in Italy (872)
 Saint Edith of Polesworth, Abbess of Polesworth in England and a sister of a King of England (c. 925)

Post-Schism Orthodox saints
 Saint Zosima, monk, of Alexandrov, Vladimir (c. 1713)
 Saint Job (Kundrya), Archimandrite, of Malaya Ugolka, Carpatho-Russia (1985)  (see also: October 9 - Uncovering of relics)

New martyrs and confessors
 New Hieromartyr Vladimir, Archpriest of Lipsinsk.
 New Hieromartyr Peter Troitsky, Deacon (1938)

Other commemorations
 Translation of the relics (971) of St. Swithun, Bishop and Wonderworker, of Winchester (863)
 Finding of the head of Saint Matrona of Chios (1462)  (see also: October 20)
 Synaxis of All Saints of Kiev.

Icon gallery

Notes

References

Sources
 July 15/July 28. Orthodox Calendar (PRAVOSLAVIE.RU).
 July 28 / July 15. HOLY TRINITY RUSSIAN ORTHODOX CHURCH (A parish of the Patriarchate of Moscow).
 July 15. OCA - The Lives of the Saints.
 July 15. The Year of Our Salvation - Holy Transfiguration Monastery, Brookline, Massachusetts. 
 The Autonomous Orthodox Metropolia of Western Europe and the Americas (ROCOR). St. Hilarion Calendar of Saints for the year of our Lord 2004. St. Hilarion Press (Austin, TX). p. 52.
 The Fifteenth Day of the Month of July. Orthodoxy in China.
 July 15. Latin Saints of the Orthodox Patriarchate of Rome.
 The Roman Martyrology. Transl. by the Archbishop of Baltimore. Last Edition, According to the Copy Printed at Rome in 1914. Revised Edition, with the Imprimatur of His Eminence Cardinal Gibbons. Baltimore: John Murphy Company, 1916. pp. 207–208.
 Rev. Richard Stanton. A Menology of England and Wales, or, Brief Memorials of the Ancient British and English Saints Arranged According to the Calendar, Together with the Martyrs of the 16th and 17th Centuries. London: Burns & Oates, 1892. pp. 337–341.
 Greek Sources
 Great Synaxaristes:  15 ΙΟΥΛΙΟΥ. ΜΕΓΑΣ ΣΥΝΑΞΑΡΙΣΤΗΣ.
  Συναξαριστής. 15 Ιουλίου. ECCLESIA.GR. (H ΕΚΚΛΗΣΙΑ ΤΗΣ ΕΛΛΑΔΟΣ). 
  15/07/2018. Ορθόδοξος Συναξαριστής. 
 Russian Sources
  28 июля (15 июля). Православная Энциклопедия под редакцией Патриарха Московского и всея Руси Кирилла (электронная версия). (Orthodox Encyclopedia - Pravenc.ru).
  15 июля по старому стилю / 28 июля по новому стилю. СПЖ "Союз православных журналистов". 2018.
  15 июля (ст.ст.) 28 июля 2014 (нов. ст.). Русская Православная Церковь Отдел внешних церковных связей. (DECR).

July in the Eastern Orthodox calendar